Alicia Fernández Fraga (born 21 December 1992) is a Spanish female handballer for SCM Râmnicu Vâlcea and the Spanish national team.

Honours

Club  
Spanish Division:
Winner: 2016
Silver Medalist: 2017

Spanish Cup:
Winner: 2016
Silver Medalist: 2017

Spanish League Cup:
Winner: 2016
Silver Medalist: 2017

Romanian National League:
Winner: 2019

Romanian Supercup:
Winner: 2018

Romanian Cup:
Finalist: 2018, 2019

Mediterranean Games:
Gold Medalist: 2018

Individual
 Liga Națională Foreign Player of the Year: 2019

References

External links

1992 births
Living people
Spanish female handball players
Spanish expatriate sportspeople in Romania
Expatriate handball players
Mediterranean Games gold medalists for Spain
Mediterranean Games medalists in handball
Competitors at the 2018 Mediterranean Games
SCM Râmnicu Vâlcea (handball) players
People from Ferrol (comarca)
Sportspeople from the Province of A Coruña
Handball players at the 2020 Summer Olympics
21st-century Spanish women